TMC may stand for:

Companies and brands
Thinking Machines Corporation, a defunct supercomputer company
Toyota Motor Corporation, a Japanese automobile manufacturer
Transportation Management Center, a division of American shipping company C.H. Robinson
Transportation Manufacturing Corporation, a defunct bus manufacturer based in Roswell, New Mexico
Triumph Motor Company, a defunct British automotive manufacturer

Educational and medical institutions
Tehran Monolingual Corpus, a Persian monolingual text corpus, Iran

Texas Medical Center, a medical institution

Thanjavur Medical College, a golden jubilee college in Tamil Nadu, India
Thomson Medical Centre, a private hospital in Novena, Singapore
Thurgood Marshall College, a college within University of California, San Diego
Thursday Morning Club, a not-for-profit organization in Madison, New Jersey

Tripura Medical College & Dr. B.R. Ambedkar Memorial Teaching Hospital, India

Tucson Medical Center, a not-for-profit community hospital
Thomas More College (South Africa), a leading private school in South Africa
Washtenaw Technical Middle College

Gaming
The Legend of Zelda: The Minish Cap, a video game
The Mud Connector, a Web portal site covering MUDs, text-based online role-playing games

Locations
Trece Martires, a city in Cavite, Philippines

Television
The Movie Channel, a cable television network
Télé Monte Carlo, French language television channel in Monaco
La7, Italian private television channel formerly known as Telemontecarlo
Tagalized Movie Channel, a Philippine cable channel

Politics
All India Trinamool Congress, a state political party in West Bengal, India
Tamil Maanila Congress, a political party in Tamil Nadu, India
Transitional Military Council (disambiguation), interim governments in Chad and Sudan

Other uses
Taipei Music Center, performing arts and cultural center in Taipei, Taiwan
Thomas & Mack Center, an indoor arena on the campus of the University of Nevada, Las Vegas opened in 1983
Traffic Message Channel, a technology for delivering traffic and travel information to drivers
Travel management company, managing corporate travel
Transportation Materiel Command, a unit of the United States Army until 1962
Trapeziometacarpal joint, a joint in the thumb
 Tmcft (TMC, tmc) (thousand million cubic feet), a volume measurement of water
Run TMC, a high-scoring trio of teammates in the National Basketball Association from 1989 to 1991